After a 15-year hiatus, the Carleton University Ravens Canadian football team returned to Canadian Interuniversity Sport play, as part of the 2013 CIS football season. The season began on Labour Day (Sept 2) with a 71-4 loss to the Western Mustangs. The season wrapped up on October 19 when McMaster Marauders defeated Carleton 45-3 at home at Keith Harris Stadium in Ottawa. The team was winless in their 8 games and was outscored 95-390. The team finished last, in 11th place in the OUA conference.

Roster

(c) - Team Captains

Regular season
The Ravens play an 8-game schedule, playing all but two OUA football teams, the Laurier Golden Hawks and the Queen's Golden Gaels.

Game Summaries

Vs. Western

Vs. Waterloo

Vs. Windsor

Vs. York

Vs. Toronto

Vs. Ottawa

The Panda Game returns for the first time since 1998.

Vs. Gryphons

Vs. McMaster

References

2013 in Canadian football
Carleton Ravens football seasons
Carleton Ravens football